The , the seventh Paralympic Winter Games, were held alongside the Winter Olympics in Nagano, Japan from 5 to 14 March 1998. They were the first Paralympic Winter Games to be held outside Europe. 571 athletes competed in Nagano; as 2022 it remains the highest number of athletes competing at any Winter Paralympics.

Sports
The games consisted of 122 events in five sports: alpine skiing, ice sledge hockey, ice sledge racing, and Nordic skiing. The sport of Nordic skiing comprised two disciplines, the biathlon and cross-country skiing.
  Alpine skiing
  Sledge hockey
  Ice sledge racing
 Nordic skiing
  Biathlon
  Cross-country skiing

Venues 
In total seven venues were used at the 1998 Winter Olympics around four cities and towns.

Nagano 
M-Wave – opening/closing ceremonies, ice sledge racing
Aqua Wing Arena – ice sledge hockey

Hakuba
Happo'one Resort: Alpine skiing (Downhill and Super-G)
Snow Harp, Kamishiro: Cross-country skiing

Nozawaonsen
Nozawa Onsen Ski Resort: Biathlon

Yamanouchi
Mount Higashidate: Alpine skiing (giant slalom)
Mount Yakebitai, Shiga Kogen Resort: Alpine skiing (slalom)

Medal table

The top 10 NPCs by number of gold medals are listed below. The host nation (Japan) is highlighted.

Participants
Thirty-one National Paralympic Committees (NPCs) entered athletes at the 1998 Winter Paralympics.  The number in parentheses indicates the number of participants from each NPC.

 (8)
 (4)
 (34)
 (5)
 (3)
 (33)
 (6)
 (3)
 (15)
 (21)
 (25)
 (40)
 (21)
 (2)
 (21)
 (67)
 (1)
 (4)
 (3)
 (5)
 (43)
 (26)
 (35)
 (18)
 (1)
 (1)
 (14)
 (24)
 (19)
 (11)
 (49)

Mascot

The 1998 Winter Paralympics Mascot was Parabbit.

Opening ceremony
The theme of the Opening Ceremony was Hope, and inspired by a painting by George Frederic Watts. The theme also signifies it was the first Winter Paralympics held in Asia and the last Paralympics of the 20th century.

See also

 1998 Winter Olympics

References

External links
 International Paralympic Committee
 The event at SVT's open archive  
 The event at Nagano Shinano Mainich Shimbum 

 
Paralympics
Winter Paralympics
Paralympics
Winter Paralympic Games
Sports competitions in Nagano (city)
Multi-sport events in Japan
March 1998 sports events in Asia
Winter sports competitions in Japan